Banasa dimidiata, the green burgundy stink bug, is a species of stink bug in the family Pentatomidae. It is found in North America.

References

External links

 

Shield bugs